Barefoot Boy is a 1938 American children's adventure film, directed by Karl Brown, and "suggested" by the poem of the same name by American writer John Greenleaf Whittier. Text from the original poem is recited after the titles.

Plot
Kenneth Hale, a pampered, snobbish young boy is sent by his father, John Hale, who has served time in prison for a crime he did not commit, down to the country farm of an old friend, Calvin Whittaker. The barefooted, honest and plucky Billy Whittaker, his girlfriend Julia Blaine, her older sister Pige, and punky Kenneth get involved with a "haunted" house and a gang of crooks, while Billy helps make a "better man" out of Kenneth.

Cast
 Jackie Moran as Billy Whittaker
 Marcia Mae Jones as Pige Blaine
 Bradley Metcalfe as Kenneth Hale
 Johnnie Morris as Jeff Blaine
 Marilyn Knowlden as Julia Blaine
 Terry as herself
 Ralph Morgan as John Hale
 Claire Windsor as Valerie Hale
 Helen MacKellar as Martha Whittaker
 Matty Fain as Blake
 Frank Puglia as Hank
 J. Farrell MacDonald as Warden
 Charles D. Brown as Calvin Whittaker
 Roger Gray as Dutch
 Earle Hodgins as Sheriff
 Henry Roquemore as Benjamin Blaine
 Hal Cooke as Parker

External links
 
 

1938 films
American black-and-white films
Monogram Pictures films
1930s adventure drama films
American adventure drama films
1938 drama films
1930s English-language films
1930s American films